Herophon son of Anaxagoras was a Macedonian sculptor of the 2nd and 1st centuries BC. He is known from an inscription in Olympia, where he created a sculpture of Zeus for Eleans and other Greeks honouring Rome.

Herophon was also an envoy of Perseus of Macedon, sent to Eumenes II of Pergamon.

References
Elis-Olympia-Epigraphical Database - IvO 317  
The Annals of the World  by James Ussher

2nd-century BC Greek sculptors
Ancient Greek sculptors
Ancient Macedonian sculptors
2nd-century BC Macedonians
Ancient Macedonians in Greece proper
Roman-era Macedonians
Roman Olympia